The 2008 WPS General Draft took place on October 6, 2008.  It was the first general draft held by Women's Professional Soccer to assign the WPS rights of international and domestic players to the American-based teams.

Round 1

Round 2

Round 3

Round 4

Draft notes
The order was established based on a lottery done at the Board of Governors meeting on September 15, 2008 prior to the U.S. National Team allocation on September 17. The order was 1-7, 7-1, 1-7, 7-1.  The WPS General Draft was open to both domestic and international players.

See also
List of foreign WPS players

External links
Complete draft coverage

2008
General Draft
Lists of women's association football players
Association football player non-biographical articles
WPS General Draft